Manordeilo is a village in Carmarthenshire, Wales, near the River Tywi.

External links
 Manordeilo and Salem Community Council website

Villages in Carmarthenshire